In the fields of sociology and political science, authority is the legitimate power of a person or group over other people. In a civil state, authority is practiced in ways such a judicial branch or an executive branch of government.

In the exercise of governance, the terms authority and power are inaccurate synonyms. The term authority identifies the political legitimacy, which grants and justifies the ruler's right to exercise the power of government; and the term power identifies the ability to accomplish an authorized goal, either by compliance or by obedience; hence, authority is the power to make decisions and the legitimacy to make such legal decisions and order their execution.

History 
Ancient understandings of authority trace back to Rome and draw later from Catholic (Thomistic) thought and other traditional understandings. In more modern terms, forms of authority include transitional authority (exhibited in, for example, Cambodia), public authority in the form of popular power, and, in more administrative terms, bureaucratic or managerial techniques. In terms of bureaucratic governance, one limitation of the governmental agents of the executive branch, as outlined by George A. Krause, is that they are not as close to the popular will as elected representatives are. The claims of authority can extend to national or individual sovereignty, which is broadly or provisionally understood as a claim to political authority that is legitimated.

Historical applications of authority in political terms include the formation of the city-state of Geneva, and experimental treatises involving the topic of authority in relation to education include Emile, or On Education by Jean-Jacques Rousseau. As David Laitin defines, authority is a key concept to be defined in determining the range and role of political theory, science and inquiry. The relevance of a grounded understanding of authority includes the basic foundation and formation of political, civil and/or ecclesiastical institutions or representatives. In recent years, however, authority in political contexts has been challenged or questioned.

Political philosophy 
There have been several contributions to the debate of political authority. Among others, Hannah Arendt, Carl Joachim Friedrich, Thomas Hobbes, Alexandre Kojève and Carl Schmitt have provided some of the most influential texts.

In European political philosophy, the jurisdiction of political authority, the location of sovereignty, the balancing of notions of freedom and authority, and the requirements of political obligations have been core questions from the time of Plato and Aristotle to the present. Most democratic societies are engaged in an ongoing discussion regarding the legitimate extent of the exercise of governmental authority. In the United States, for instance, there is a prevailing belief that the political system as instituted by the Founding Fathers should accord the populace as much freedom as reasonable; that government should limit its authority accordingly, known as limited government.

Political anarchism is a philosophy which rejects the legitimacy of political authority and adherence to any form of sovereign rule or autonomy of a nation-state. An argument for political anarchy is made by Michael Huemer in his book The Problem of Political Authority. On the other side, one of the main arguments for the legitimacy of the state is some form of the social contract theory developed by Thomas Hobbes in his 1668 book, Leviathan, or by Jean-Jacques Rousseau in his political writings on the social contract.

Sociology 

Since the emergence of the social sciences, authority has become a subject of research in a variety of empirical settings: the family (parental authority), small groups (informal authority of leadership), intermediate organizations such as schools, churches, armies, industries and bureaucracies (organizational and bureaucratic authority), and society-wide or inclusive organizations, ranging from the most primitive tribal society to the modern nation-state and intermediate organization (political authority).

The definition of authority in contemporary social science remains a matter of debate. Max Weber in his essay "Politics as a Vocation" (1919) divided legitimate authority into three types. Others, like Howard Bloom, suggest a parallel between authority and respect/reverence for ancestors.

United Kingdom and the Commonwealth realms 
The political authority in the British context can be traced to James VI and I of Scotland who wrote two political treatises called Basilikon Doron and The True Law of Free Monarchies: Or, The Reciprocal and Mutual Duty Between a Free King and His Natural Subjects which advocated his right to rule on the basis of the concept of the divine right of kings, a theological concept that has a basis in multiple religions, but in this case, Christianity, tracing this right to the apostolic succession.

Sovereign kings and queens in the United Kingdom and the Commonwealth realms are considered the foundations of judicial, legislative and executive authority.

United States 
The understanding of political authority and the exercise of political powers in the American context traces back to the writings of the Founding Fathers, including the arguments put forward in The Federalist Papers by James Madison, Alexander Hamilton and the first chief justice of the United States John Jay, and later speeches by the 16th president of the United States Abraham Lincoln. "Our government rests in public opinion," Lincoln said in 1856. In his 1854 speech at Peoria, Illinois, Lincoln espoused the proposition “that each man should do precisely as he pleases with all which is exclusively his own," a principle existing "at the foundation of the sense of justice." This sense of personal ownership and stewardship was integral to the practice of self-government as Lincoln saw it by a Republican nation and its people. This was because, as Lincoln also declared, "No man is good enough to govern another man, without that other's consent."

The U.S. president is called to give account to the legislature for the conduct of the whole government, including that of regulatory agencies. The president influences the appointments, the budgeting process and has the right and capacity to review regulatory rules on a case-by-case basis. Since the time of the Reagan administration the president was informed with a cost–benefit analysis of the regulation. The creation of a regulatory agency requires an Act of Congress which specifies its jurisdiction, the related authority and delegated powers. Regulatory authorities can be qualified as independent agencies or executive branch agencies, a choice which is the reason of struggle between congress and the president as well as with the American courts. The latter's role is limited by the authorities' power to regulate property rights without the due process rights mandatorily applied by the courts.

See also 

 Authority bias
 Authority (management)
 Anti-authoritarianism
 Appeal to authority
 Auctoritas
 Authoritarianism
 Discipline
 Fidelity
 Milgram experiment
 Morale
 Political theology
 Protection
 Petty authority
 Question authority

References

Further reading 
 Giorgio Agamben, State of Exception (2005)
 Hannah Arendt, "Authority in the Twentieth Century." Review of Politics (1956)
 Hannah Arendt, On Violence (1970)
 Józef Maria Bocheński, ? (1974)
 Renato Cristi, Hegel on Freedom and Authority (2005)
 Carl Joachim Friedrich, Authority. Cambridge, MA: Harvard University Press (1958)
 Carl Joachim Friedrich, An Introduction to Political Theory: Twelve Lectures at Harvard. New York: Harper & Row (1967)
 Carl Joachim Friedrich, Tradition and Authority. London: Macmillan (1972)
 Robert E. Goodin (ed), The Oxford Handbook of Political Science (2011) 
 Sebastian De Grazia. (1959). "What Authority Is Not". American Political Science Review 53(2): 321–331.
 Patrick Hayden, Hannah Arendt: Key Concepts (2014), esp. Chapter 8
 Alexandre Kojève, "The Notion of Authority" (2014)
 Rafael Domingo Osle, Auctoritas (1999)
 Gail Radford, The Rise of the Public Authority: Statebuilding and Economic Development in Twentieth-Century America (2013)
 Carl Schmitt, Der Begriff des Politischen [The Concept of the Political] (1932) 
 Max Weber, Economy and Society (1922)
 Max Weber, Politics as a Vocation (1919)

External links 

 
 Appeal to Authority Breakdown
 
 Four essays published in the International Journal of Philosophical Studies from the Robert Papazian Essay Prize Competition on Authority

 
Group processes
Philosophy of law
Political philosophy
Social concepts
Social ethics